ARM Mariano Matamoros may refer to one of the following patrol vessels of the Mexican Navy:

 , the former American  USS Herald (AM-101); acquired by the Mexican Navy on 1 February 1973; converted to a survey ship; stricken before 1993
 , the former American Auk-class minesweeper USS Sage (AM-111); acquired by the Mexican Navy on 4 November 1973 and renamed ARM Hermenegildo Galeana (C86); renamed ARM Mariano Matamoros (P117) to free name Hermenegildo Galeana for the former American  USS Bronstein (FF-1037), acquired by the Mexican Navy in 1993

Mexican Navy ship names